This is a list of transfers in Bosnian football for the 2012 summer transfer window.
Only moves featuring a Premier League of Bosnia and Herzegovina, First League of the Republika Srpska and First League of the Federation of Bosnia and Herzegovina side are listed.

Premier League of Bosnia and Herzegovina

Borac Banja Luka

In:

Out:

Čelik

In:

Out:

GOŠK

In:

Out:

Gradina

In:

Out:

Leotar

In:

Out:

Olimpic

In:

Out:

Radnik

In:

Out:

Rudar Prijedor

In:

Out:

Sarajevo

In:

Out:

Široki Brijeg

In:

Out:

Slavija

In:

Out:

Travnik

In:

Out:

Velež

In:

Out:

Željezničar

In:

Out:

Zrinjski

In:

Out:

Zvijezda Gradačac

In:

Out:

First League of the Republika Srpska

Borac Šamac

In:

Out:

Drina HE

In:

Out:

Drina Zvornik

In:

Out:

Kozara

In:

Out:

Ljubić

In:

Out:

Mladost Velika Obarska

In:

Out:

Mladost Gacko

In:

Out:

Modriča

In:

Out:

Podrinje

In:

Out:

Rudar Ugljevik

In:

Out:

Sloboda Mrkonjić Grad

In:

Out:

Sloboda Novi Grad

In:

Out:

Sloga Doboj

In:

Out:

Sutjeska Foča

In:

Out:

First League of the Federation of Bosnia and Herzegovina

Bosna

In:

Out:

Branitelj

In:

Out:

Bratstvo

In:

Out:

Budućnost

In:

Out:

Čapljina

In:

Out:

Goražde

In:

Out:

Iskra

In:

Out:

Jedinstvo

In:

Out:

Krajina

In:

Out:

Krajišnik

In:

Out:

Podgrmeč

In:

Out:

Radnički

In:

Out:

Rudar

In:

Out:

Sloboda

In:

Out:

Troglav

In:

Out:

Vitez

In:

Out:

See also
Premier League of Bosnia and Herzegovina
First League of the Republika Srpska
First League of the Federation of Bosnia and Herzegovina
2012–13 Premier League of Bosnia and Herzegovina
2012–13 First League of the Republika Srpska
2012–13 First League of the Federation of Bosnia and Herzegovina

References
Summer 2012 Premier League transfers at SportSport.ba on 3 August 2012
Regional transfers:
 List of Serbian football transfers summer 2012
 Montenegrin First League 2012 summer transfers at CGfudbal

Transfers
Bosnia
2012